Morteza Mahmoudi (born 1979) is an Iranian-American nanotechnologist and Assistant Professor in the Department of Radiology at Michigan State University.
Previously, he was an assistant professor at Harvard University. 
Mahmoudi is a winner of 2018 BRIght Futures Prize, 2018 IGNITE Award, and 2016 USERN Prize.
He is best known for his works on academic bullying; he is also a co-founder of a non-profit organization called the Academic Parity Movement which is focused on addressing academic bullying issue in various disciplines.

Books
 A Brief Guide to Academic Bullying, 2022
 Protein-Nanoparticle Interactions: The Bio-Nano Interface 2013
 Iron Oxide Nanoparticles for Biomedical Applications 2017
 Superparamagnetic Iron Oxide Nanoparticles 2010
 Protein-Nanoparticle Interactions: The Bio-Nano Interface 2013

References

External links

Iranian nanotechnologists
Living people
1979 births
Sharif University of Technology alumni
Harvard Medical School faculty
Michigan State University faculty
Stanford University alumni
Iranian biotechnologists